Wild Young Hearts is the second studio album by British indie soul group Noisettes, released in the United Kingdom on 20 April 2009 by Vertigo Records, and the United States on 22 September 2009 by Mercury Records. Three singles were released from the album – "Wild Young Hearts", "Don't Upset the Rhythm (Go Baby Go)", and "Never Forget You", with "Every Now and Then" meant to be released as the fourth single, but was cancelled.

Singles
The first single released from the album was the title track – "Wild Young Hearts". It was released on 29 December 2008 and the video premiered on the official Noisettes' YouTube channel on 7 January 2009. However, the single failed to enter the UK charts, but was later re-released on 30 August 2009, replacing "Every Now and Then" which was originally meant to be the fourth single. The re-release helped it to reach a peak of number 91 in the UK.
The second single was "Don't Upset the Rhythm (Go Baby Go)", released on 23 March 2009. There were two videos for the single, the second released less than two months after the first. The song was featured on a Mazda 2 advert, and this helped it to debut at number two in the UK upon release. "Don't Upset the Rhythm" is the group's best selling and performing single, spending 10 weeks in the Top 40 and 22 weeks in the Top 40.
The third single was "Never Forget You" which was released on 15 June 2009, and made the A list on XFM, Radio 2, Capital and Q radio and was also added to the C list on Radio 1. It debuted at number 68 on downloads alone, and entered the Top 40 at number 31 two weeks later. "Never Forget You" eventually made a peak of number 20 on the week ending 8 August 2009.
"Every Now and Then" was originally meant to be the album's fourth single, to be released on 30 August 2009. A video was also released, however a few weeks before the song was to be released, it was cancelled and a re-release of "Wild Young Hearts" was released instead.
A music video for "Saturday Night" was made up of recordings by fans using only Nokia mobile devices, at an exclusive live performance in East London. However, the song was never released as a single.

Critical reception

The album received critical acclaim. On review aggregate website Metacritic, it was awarded a rating of 74/100. 4 out of 5 stars was awarded by Digital Spy and 8 out of 10 stars by Drowned in Sound. Essence magazine remarked that the album "has a 1960's-tinged soulful rock sound that stays firmly etched in your mind."
Lead Singer Shoniwa's voice and presence was praised, while criticism focussed on the merging of multiple genres. The musicians on the album were also heavily praised.

Track listing
All tracks are produced by Jim Abbiss.

Chart performance
In the UK, Wild Young Hearts debuted at number 7 on the week ending 2 May 2009, making it the second highest debut of the week, behind Depeche Mode's Sounds of the Universe who debuted at number two. In its second week, it fell 16 places to number 23, and after another two weeks, it was out of the Top 100. However, the success of "Never Forget You" helped the album return to the Top 40 and climb as high as number nine. On the first chart of 2010, Wild Young Hearts re-entered the Top 40 at number 35. In total, Wild Young Hearts spent 16 weeks in the Top 40 and was certified Gold by the BPI for shipments of over 100,000 copies.

In Ireland, Wild Young Hearts debuted at number 36 on the week ending 23 April 2009, but dropped to number 55 in its second week. The album eventually reached a peak of number 31, the week ending 3 September 2009.

Personnel
Personnel credits adapted from AllMusic and the liner notes of Wild Young Hearts.

 Shingai Shoniwa – vocals, performer, bass, composer, background vocals
 Dan Smith – performer, guitar, composer, percussion
 Jamie Morrison – performer, drums, composer, percussion
 Jim Abbiss – producer, keyboards, tambourine
 Paul Adam & His Mayfair Music – A&R
 George Astasio – writer, composer
 Natalia Bonner – violin
 Duchess Nell Catchpole – violin
 Susan Collins – executive producer
 Ewan Davies – engineer, mixing, tambourine
 Emily Davis – violin
 Calina de la Mare – violin

 Sandrine Dulermo – photography
 Luke Gordon – programming
 Stephen Hussey – violin
 Steven Large – clavinet, piano
 Vicky Matthews – cello
 Jason Pebworth – writer, composer
 Lucy Shaw – double bass, string arrangements
 Lucy Wilkins – violin
 Richard Wilkinson – mixing
 Chris Worsey – cello
 Miriam Nervo – backing vocals, vocal producer
 Olivia Nervo – backing vocals, vocal producer

Charts

Weekly charts

Year-end charts

Certifications

Release history

References

2009 albums
Noisettes albums
Vertigo Records albums
Albums produced by Jim Abbiss